Herich Ruiz is a Cuban boxer. He participated at the 2021 AIBA World Boxing Championships, being awarded the bronze medal in the cruiserweight event. In 2022, Ruiz emigrated to the United States.

References

External links 

Living people
Year of birth missing (living people)
Place of birth missing (living people)
Cuban male boxers
Cruiserweight boxers
AIBA World Boxing Championships medalists
Cuban emigrants to the United States
21st-century Cuban people